Tan Duc Nguyen (born 1973) is an American former politician. He twice ran as a candidate for the U.S. House of Representatives in California.  In 2006, he ran as a Republican against incumbent Democrat Loretta Sanchez in California's 47th congressional district.

On February 14, 2011, Nguyen was sentenced by United States District Judge David O. Carter to 366 days in federal prison followed by six months in a halfway house for lying to investigators about his knowledge of a letter to intimidate Latino voters from voting in his 2006 race.

2004 Congressional campaign as a Democrat
In 2004, Nguyen lost the 46th district Democratic primary to Jim Brandt, who lost to incumbent Republican Dana Rohrabacher by a 30% margin.

2006 Congressional campaign as a Republican

Nguyen won the Republican Party's endorsement to run for the 47th Congressional District of California in the June 6, 2006 primary election with 55.4% of the votes in a three-way race.  Nguyen lost to incumbent Loretta Sanchez in the November election, receiving 37.6% of the votes.

Campaign mailing controversy

Nguyen's campaign was linked to a Spanish-language mailing of 14,000 letters allegedly warning immigrants not to vote, threatening them with prison or deportation. The letter was received by registered Hispanic voters the weekend of October 15, 2006 and sent to then-California Attorney General Bill Lockyer, who launched an investigation into the source of the letter on Monday, October 17, 2006. As translated in the press at the time, it read in part:

You are being sent this letter because you were recently registered to vote. If you are a citizen of the United States, we ask that you participate in the democratic process of voting. You are advised that if your residence in this country is illegal or you are an immigrant, voting in a federal election is a crime that could result in imprisonment, and you will be deported for voting without having the right to do so.

The letter was issued on the letterhead of the California Coalition for Immigration Reform; however, its chairwoman denied any involvement.  Nguyen denied any personal involvement in the incident, and stated that an employee in his office who might have been responsible had since been fired. In the meantime, a national coalition of ethnic bar associations formed, led by the Mexican American Legal Defense Fund and spearheaded by its former President and General Counsel, John Trasvina. The coalition drafted and signed a joint letter calling for an investigation into the letter. On Friday, October 20, California Department of Justice agents raided Nguyen's campaign headquarters in Garden Grove and his home in Santa Ana.

On May 16, 2007, the California Department of Justice investigation determined there was no evidence that Nguyen's campaign had an intent to intimidate those legally entitled to vote. The investigation had found that the original draft of the letter (in English) had warned illegals and those with green cards against voting, but elsewhere had encouraged those with U.S. citizenship to vote.  The phrase "those with green cards" had then been translated into "emigrado" for the Spanish-language letter that was mailed; this had later been translated back into English as "immigrant" when the letter was brought to light in the media.  Senior Assistant Attorney General Gary Schons stated the investigation found that Nguyen did, in fact, know about the letter before it was mailed, in contradiction to Nguyen's repeated assertions that he was not aware of it.  Nguyen, who continued to deny involvement with the letter, in other respects, stated satisfaction with the investigation results and considered himself exonerated.

Obstruction of justice indictment 

Despite the California Attorney General declining to press charges against Nguyen, a federal grand jury indicted him on a charge of obstruction of justice brought against him by the United States Attorney's Office for the Central District of California and the Civil Rights Division of the U.S. Justice Department. There were two jury trials which were presided over by United States District Court Judge David O. Carter. Nguyen was found guilty by a jury and was sentenced in February 2011 by Carter to one year in prison and six months in a halfway house.

Nguyen's conviction was upheld on appeal to the U.S. Court of Appeals for the Ninth Circuit.

See also
Caging list
Voter turnout

References

External links 
Tan Nguyen Campaign Website
Tan Nguyen Election History

California politicians of Vietnamese descent
1973 births
Living people
Vietnamese emigrants to the United States
California Democrats
California Republicans
California politicians convicted of crimes
Asian conservatism in the United States